Enrique "Quique" Coria (coh-rhia) is a guitarist from Dique Los Molinos, Argentina.

Coria has appeared on over 400 recordings in South America and the US including with David Grisman's DGQ (David Grisman Quintet).

He speaks both Spanish and English and currently resides in Oakland, California with his wife, singer, Yolanda Aranda. Coria has two children from his first marriage, the eldest being Carol and ten years younger, Raymundo Coria.

Recordings 
Solos From South America (ACD 6, Acoustic Disc Records)
Latin Touch (ACD 23, Acoustic Disc Records)
Intimo with Yolanda Aranda (ACD 50, Acoustic Disc Records)
Dawganova with David Grisman Quintet (ACD 17, Acoustic Disc Records)
DGQ 20 with David Grisman Quintet (ACD 20, Acoustic Disc Records)
Dawgnation with David Grisman Quintet (ACD 49, Acoustic Disc Records)

External links 
Biography at Acoustic Disc Records
Info (Elixir Strings)

Argentine classical guitarists
Argentine male guitarists
Year of birth missing (living people)
Living people
David Grisman Quintet members